Atavdy (Atawźı) is a rural locality (a village) in Yangilsky Selsoviet, Abzelilovsky District, Bashkortostan, Russia. The population was 614 as of 2010. There are 9 streets.

Geography 
Atavdy is located 41 km southeast of Askarovo (the district's administrative centre) by road. Davletshino is the nearest rural locality.

References 

Rural localities in Abzelilovsky District